Leslie Thompson (born 1963) is a former American cross-country skier who competed from 1985 to 1995. Competing in three Winter Olympics, she earned her best finish of eighth in the 4 × 5 km relay at Calgary in 1988 and her best individual finish of 32nd in the 5 km + 10 km combined pursuit at Lillehammer in 1994.

Thompson's best finish at the FIS Nordic World Ski Championships was 20th twice in the 30 km event (1993, 1995). Her best World cup finish was 17th in a 10 km event in Switzerland in 1993.

Thompson earned seven individual career victories in FIS races at distances between 5 km and 30 km from 1993 to 1995.

Cross-country skiing results
All results are sourced from the International Ski Federation (FIS).

Olympic Games

World Championships

World Cup

Season standings

References

External links

Women's 4 x 5 km cross-country relay Olympic results: 1976-2002 

1963 births
American female cross-country skiers
Cross-country skiers at the 1988 Winter Olympics
Cross-country skiers at the 1992 Winter Olympics
Cross-country skiers at the 1994 Winter Olympics
Olympic cross-country skiers of the United States
Living people
Sportspeople from Vermont
21st-century American women